Ed-Air Airport  is a private use airport in Knox County, Indiana, United States. It is located three nautical miles (6 km) southwest of the central business district of Oaktown, Indiana, and was previously a public use airport.

History 
The airfield was built between 1943 and 1944. It was known as Emison Field or George Field Auxiliary, operated as a satellite of George Army Airfield. It was closed by the military after World War II. It later operated as a civil airfield known as Emison Airport or Green Airport.

Facilities and aircraft 
Ed-Air Airport resides at elevation of 426 feet (130 m) above mean sea level. It has one runway designated 18/36 with an asphalt surface measuring 5,800 by 100 feet (1,768 x 30 m).

There are four aircraft based at this airport: one single-engine, two multi-engine, and one helicopter.

See also 
 Indiana World War II Army Airfields
 List of airports in Indiana

References

External links 
 Ed-Air, Inc.
 Aerial image as of February 1998 from USGS The National Map
 

Airports in Indiana
Transportation buildings and structures in Knox County, Indiana